Chinese Taipei competed at the 2012 Winter Youth Olympics in Innsbruck, Austria. The Chinese Taipei team was made up of four athletes in three sports.

Alpine skiing

Chinese Taipei has qualified one boy in alpine skiing.

Boy

Luge

Chinese Taipei has qualified one boy in luge.

Boy

Short track speed skating

Chinese Taipei has qualified one male and female short track speed skater.

Boy

Girl

Mixed

See also
Chinese Taipei at the 2012 Summer Olympics

References

Nations at the 2012 Winter Youth Olympics
2012 in Taiwanese sport
Chinese Taipei at the Youth Olympics